The 1967 Australia rugby union tour of New Zealand was the sixteenth Australian tour of New Zealand and the first since 1964 (or ). It was succeeded by the 1972 tour of New Zealand and Fiji, exactly five years. Unlike both teams' usual arrangement of playing a two- or three-match series, the 1967 tour was a one-off match, the first since Australia's 1931 tour and wouldn't be repeated again until New Zealand's 1979 tour of Australia.

Despite the significant margin going the way of New Zealand, the half-time scoreline was 9–3 in New Zealand's favour with New Zealand scoring two penalty goals and one drop goal. While Australia had one try (unconverted) via Rod Batterham.

Fixtures

Match details

References

Australia national rugby union team tours of New Zealand
tour
tour